The Indian Ambassador to the Greece is the chief diplomatic representative of India to the Greece, housed in Athens.

List of Indian Ambassadors to Greece
The following people have served as Indian Ambassadors to the Hellenic Republic.

See also
 Embassy of India, Athens

External links
 Ambassadors of India to Greece

References 

Greece
India